Svyatonossky Gulf (Svyatonossky zaliv) is a body of water off the northeastern coast of the Kola Peninsula, Murmansk Oblast, Russia. Bukhtovka River flows to the gulf. Cape Svyatoy Nos separates the gulf from the Barents Sea. 

Gulfs of Russia
Gulfs of the Arctic Ocean
Bays of Murmansk Oblast